PKS 2000-330 (also known as QSO B2000-330) is a quasar located in the constellation Sagittarius.  When identified in 1982, it was the most distant and most luminous object known.

Distance measurements
The "distance" of a far away galaxy depends on the distance measurement used.  With a redshift of 3.77, light from this active galaxy is estimated to have taken around 11.7 billion years to reach us.  But since this galaxy is receding from Earth at an estimated rate of 274,681 km/s (the speed of light is 299,792 km/s), the present (co-moving) distance to this galaxy is estimated to be around 22.7 billion light-years (6947 Mpc).

See also
List of the most distant astronomical objects

References

External links
 Wikisky image of PKS 2000-330

Quasars
Sagittarius (constellation)